Theodorou is a Greek patronymic surname, the genitive form of the name Theodoros. It can refer to:
Elias Theodorou (1988–2022), Canadian mixed martial artist 
Nick Theodorou (born 1975), American baseball player
Nikolas Theodorou (born 2000), Greek chess grandmaster
Panos Theodorou (born 1994), Cypriot football midfielder
Paraskevi Theodorou (born 1986), Cypriot hammer thrower 
Zacharias Theodorou (born 1993), Cypriot football midfielder

See also
 Theodoridis

Greek-language surnames
Surnames
Patronymic surnames
Surnames from given names